Marshal of Yugoslavia was the highest rank of the Yugoslav People's Army (Marshal, equivalent to field marshal), and, simultaneously, a Yugoslav honorific title.

History of the rank

The only person to ever hold the rank of "Marshal of Yugoslavia" was Josip Broz Tito, with the term "Marshal" becoming synonymous with his name in Yugoslavia. He received it at the second session of AVNOJ in the Bosnian town of Jajce on 29 November 1943, and held it until his death on 4 May 1980. Understanding the propaganda effects uniforms had on the general population, Tito had more than 70 different marshal uniforms.

Personnel assigned to the Marshal of Yugoslavia

Adjutants

Chiefs of the Cabinet

Gallery

See also
 Uz maršala Tita

References

1943 establishments in Yugoslavia
1980 disestablishments in Yugoslavia
Military ranks of Yugoslavia
Marshals
Titles held only by one person